Estadio Roberto Bettega is a multi-use stadium in Asunción, Paraguay.  It is currently used mostly for football matches and is the home stadium of Tacuary.  The stadium holds 15,000 people. 

Multi-purpose stadiums in Paraguay
Football venues in Asunción
Sports venues in Asunción